William Anderson Hatfield (September 9, 1839 – January 6, 1921), better known as Devil Anse , was the patriarch of the Hatfield clan during the infamous Hatfield–McCoy feud which has since formed part of American folklore. Anse survived the feud and agreed to end it in 1891.

Biography
Hatfield was born September 9, 1839, in western Virginia (now Logan, West Virginia), the son of Ephraim and Nancy (Vance) Hatfield. His nickname "Devil Anse" has a variety of supposed origins.  Among these are that it was given to him by his mother; that he was named it by Randolph McCoy; that he earned the nickname from his bravery during battle in the American Civil War; or because it contrasted to his good-tempered cousin, Anderson "Preacher Anse" Hatfield. 

A Southern sympathizer, Hatfield enlisted in the Confederate Army during the American Civil War. He was commissioned a First Lieutenant of Cavalry in the Virginia State Line in 1862, a group made to protect the territory along the Kentucky-Virginia border where resident loyalties to the North and South were mixed. The Virginia State Line eventually disbanded in 1863 and Hatfield enlisted as a private in the newly formed 45th Battalion Virginia Infantry, before being appointed first lieutenant and later captain of Company  B. His unit spent most of its time patrolling the border area against bushwhackers sympathetic to the Union as well as engaging in guerrilla warfare against Union soldiers. Devil Anse himself has been connected to battles and killings of several Union fighters, including trackers Ax and Fleming Hurley in 1863.

Devil Anse and his uncle Jim Vance later formed a Confederate guerrilla fighting unit called the "Logan Wildcats." One of the group's victims was Union General Bill France; killed in revenge for losing one of their members to France's unit. In 1865, he was suspected of having been involved in the murder of his rival Asa Harmon McCoy, who had fought for the Union Army and was waylaid by The Wildcats on his return home. Hatfield had been home ill at the time of the killing, which was probably committed at the instigation of his uncle, Jim Vance. This may have sparked the beginning of the notorious feud between the two families that claimed many lives on both sides. 

Devil Anse deserted the Confederate Army in 1864 and returned home to his family in West Virginia, where he began acquiring land. Despite being illiterate, he managed to build a profitable lumber business, much of which was on thousands of acres of virgin timberland he had won in a lawsuit from McCoy relative Perry Cline.

Devil Anse was the patriarch leader during the Hatfield-McCoy feud. His family and Randolph McCoy's fought in one of the bloodiest and most well-known feuds in American history. He was instrumental during the execution of McCoy boys Tolbert, Pharmer and Bud, as well as being present during the Battle of Grapevine Creek before most of his sons and friends were arrested for the murder of the McCoys.

Hatfield was baptized on September 23, 1911 in Island Creek by William Dyke "Uncle Dyke" Garrett and converted to Christianity (he had maintained a largely agnostic or anti-institutional view of religion prior to this conversion). He went on to found a Church of Christ congregation in West Virginia. He was an uncle of the eventual Governor of West Virginia, and United States Senator, Henry D. Hatfield.

Marriage and children 
Hatfield married Levisa "Levicy" Chafin (December 20, 1842 – March 15, 1929), the daughter of Nathaniel Chafin and Matilda Varney, on April 18, 1861 in Logan County, West Virginia (then Virginia). Their 13 children were:

Death
Hatfield died on Thursday, January 6, 1921 in Sarah Ann, Logan County, West Virginia at the age of 81 of pneumonia at his home along Island Creek.  He is buried in the Hatfield Family Cemetery along West Virginia Route 44 in southern Logan County. His grave is topped by a life-sized statue of himself made of Italian marble. Levicy outlived her husband by eight years. Her great-nephew was the political kingpin, Logan County sheriff Don Chafin.

In popular culture
Hatfield was portrayed by actor Kevin Costner in the 2012 miniseries Hatfields & McCoys. For his role, Costner won both the Emmy and Golden Globe for Best Actor in a Leading Role in a Miniseries or TV Movie.

He makes a spectral appearance in Manly Wade Wellman's 1963 collection of short stories, Who Fears the Devil?.

References

Obituary for Devil Anse Hatfield
Sources for the Hatfield and McCoy Feud

1839 births
1921 deaths
American people of English descent
American bootleggers
American people of Scotch-Irish descent
People from Logan, West Virginia
Hatfield family
People of West Virginia in the American Civil War
Burials in West Virginia
Deaths from pneumonia in West Virginia
Converts to Christianity
Bushwhackers
American people of Swedish descent